Tinn Isriyanet (born 7 July 1993) is a Thai badminton player. He was past of the Thailand team that won the mixed team bronze medal at the 2010 Asian Junior Badminton Championships. He won his first senior international title at the 2015 Smiling Fish International with Wannawat Ampunsuwan. In 2017, he won the mixed team bronze medal at the Summer Universiade. He won his first BWF world tour at the 2018 Thailand Masters in the men's doubles event partnered with Kittisak Namdash.

Achievements

BWF World Tour 
The BWF World Tour, which was announced on 19 March 2017 and implemented in 2018, is a series of elite badminton tournaments sanctioned by the Badminton World Federation (BWF). The BWF World Tour is divided into levels of World Tour Finals, Super 1000, Super 750, Super 500, Super 300, and the BWF Tour Super 100.

Men's doubles

BWF International Challenge/Series 
Men's doubles

Mixed doubles

  BWF International Challenge tournament
  BWF International Series tournament
  BWF Future Series tournament

References

External links 
 
 Tinn Isriyanet at 2017.gov.taipei

Living people
1993 births
Tinn Isriyanet
Tinn Isriyanet
Badminton players at the 2018 Asian Games
Universiade medalists in badminton
Tinn Isriyanet
Tinn Isriyanet
Medalists at the 2017 Summer Universiade
Tinn Isriyanet